Neoscaptia is a genus of moths in the family Erebidae. The genus was erected by George Hampson in 1900.

Species
 Neoscaptia aequalis Jordan, 1905
 Neoscaptia albicollis Rothschild, 1912
 Neoscaptia angustifasciata Gaede, 1926
 Neoscaptia apicipuncta Rothschild, 1912
 Neoscaptia basinitens Rothschild, 1912
 Neoscaptia collateralis Hampson, 1900
 Neoscaptia eurochrysa (Hampson, 1914)
 Neoscaptia fascionitens Rothschild, 1912
 Neoscaptia flavicaput Rothschild, 1912
 Neoscaptia leucodera Jordan, 1905
 Neoscaptia poecila Jordan, 1905
 Neoscaptia torquata Eecke, 1929
 Neoscaptia unipunctata Rothschild, 1912

References

Lithosiini
Moth genera